The Baghdad Cup was a friendly football match hosted by Al-Shaab Stadium to conclude the Festival of Brotherhood, Love and Peace, an event organised by the Iraqi Ministry of Youth and Sports on 16 June 2013. The match was contested by two of the country's top clubs, Al-Shorta and Al-Zawraa, and fans were allowed free entry into the stadium for the occasion.

Al-Kadhimiya and Al-Adhamiya played against each other in a 30-minute match to open the festival; Al-Kadhimiya won 1–0 with a goal by Raddad Suhail and were awarded with the Love and Peace Cup trophy. Al-Shorta and Al-Zawraa then faced off for the Baghdad Cup trophy which was won by Al-Shorta with a winning goal from substitute striker Hussein Karim in the 57th minute.

Match

Details

References

External links
 An image of the trophy
 Iraqi Football Website

Bagh
Football in Baghdad